Air Mali, formerly Compagnie Aérienne du Mali (abbreviated as CAM), was an airline based in Mali that was formed by the Aga Khan Fund for Economic Development (AKFED) through its subsidiary IPS, West Africa and the government of Mali in April 2005.

Due to the Northern Mali conflict, the airline's operations have been suspended since December 2012.

History

CAM made its inaugural flight on 7 June 2005 from Bamako to Mopti and then to Gao, and back, with a Dash 8. The initial aim was to focus on Mali's internal network.

The company rebranded itself as Air Mali on 15 May 2009.

In July 2012, following the civil war within Mali, the airline was forced to ground their McDonnell Douglas MD-83 and McDonnell Douglas MD-87 aircraft, and decided to cease all operations on December 27, 2012. All employees were released from their duties with immediate effect, but were informed that the airline management would reassess the situation in September 2013. As of 2015, the airline was still incorporated, but not active; and no signs of a resumption in flying were to be seen.

Corporate affairs

Ownership
Shareholdings (as at August 2013) were:

Business trends
Financial and other business figures for Air Mali are not available, as the company is privately owned.

Head office
Air Mali was/is headquartered in the Immeuble Tomota in Bamako, Mali,

Destinations

Fleet 

At the time of grounding on December 27, 2012, Air Mali fleet consisted of the following aircraft:

See also

Air Mali (1960–1989)

References

External links 
Air Mali fleet

Defunct airlines of Mali
Airlines established in 2005
Airlines disestablished in 2012
Aga Khan Development Network
Companies based in Bamako
History of Bamako
2005 establishments in Africa